Obry is a surname. Notable people with the surname include: 

Hugues Obry (born 1973), French fencer and coach
Ludwig Obry (1852–1942), Austrian engineer and naval officer
OBRY is the name of the former short line railway between Orangeville and Mississauga.